Hans Kotter (1480 in Strasbourg - 1541 in Bern) was a German composer and organist of the Renaissance. Although organ music was not popular or enthusiastically supported in Strasbourg in the early Reformation years, the first known organ chorales were composed by Kotter.

He studied with Paul Hofhaimer from 1498 to 1500. Thereafter to 1508, he was organist at the Saxon court at Torgau. Subsequently he held positions in Breisgau and in Friborg (Switzerland), where he was shown, although after detention and torture because of his Protestant faith. From 1534 he taught as a schoolmaster in Berne. His organ book, which he collected from 1513 to 1522, contains the first German organ dances and pieces by Hofhaimer, Josquin des Prez, Heinrich Isaac, and others. Also preserved are ten preludes, which are kept in a somewhat impersonal style, and are close to his teacher Hofhaimer.

References 

 Brockhaus Riemann Musiklexikon, vol. 2, . 2004, digibib.

External links 

Renaissance composers
German classical organists
German male organists
German classical composers
German male classical composers
1480 births
1541 deaths
Musicians from Strasbourg
Male classical organists